Kenneth Furphy (28 May 1931 – 17 January 2015) was an English football player and manager.

Despite being on the books at Everton between 1950 and 1951, Furphy was a lower league player with Runcorn (1951–53) Darlington (1953–62) and then Workington (1962–64). He was selected to play for the Third Division North representative side in 1954–55.

In 1964, as Workington's player-manager, he led them into the Third Division and left to become player-manager at Watford where he remained for several years, winning promotion to the Second Division for the first time in the club's history in 1969, and reaching the FA Cup semi-final a year later. He moved to Blackburn Rovers as manager in 1971 for two seasons before being announced as the new manager of Sheffield United on 9 December 1973.

Despite financial difficulties due to the building of the new South Stand, he led United to sixth place in the First Division; a 0–0 draw away to Birmingham City on the last day of the 1974–75 season left them just one point short of a UEFA Cup place. However, the following season started disastrously with just one win from 11 games and his contract was terminated on 6 October 1975. Furphy left for America to manage the New York Cosmos (1975–76) in the NASL. He also coached the Miami Toros (1976–77), the Detroit Express (1977–80) and the Washington Diplomats (1981). He has also managed the national team of Bermuda and the Cleveland Force.

During the 2000–01 season he was appointed as Technical Director of Exeter City, to help then manager Noel Blake as the club battled against relegation; this tenure was short-lived, and he left the club after just six days in the job.

He also worked for BBC Radio Devon's sports department, commentating on local football matches.

He coached his son, former NASL and MISL player Keith Furphy, while both were in Detroit.

Furphy died on 17 January 2015 in a care home in Dawlish, where he had dementia.

References

External links
 

1931 births
2015 deaths
Footballers from Stockton-on-Tees
Footballers from County Durham
English footballers
Association football defenders
Everton F.C. players
Runcorn F.C. Halton players
Darlington F.C. players
Workington A.F.C. players
Watford F.C. players
English football managers
Workington A.F.C. managers
Watford F.C. managers
Blackburn Rovers F.C. managers
Sheffield United F.C. managers
North American Soccer League (1968–1984) coaches
Expatriate soccer managers in the United States
Exeter City F.C. non-playing staff